The 2007 Allianz Suisse Open Gstaad was the 2007 edition of the Allianz Suisse Open Gstaad tennis tournament. The tournament was held on July 9–15. Paul-Henri Mathieu won his second title of the year.

Finals

Singles

 Paul-Henri Mathieu defeated  Andreas Seppi, 6–7(1–7), 6–4, 7–5

Doubles

 František Čermák /  Pavel Vízner defeated  Marc Gicquel /  Florent Serra, 7–5, 5–7, [10–7]

References

 
Swiss Open (tennis)